Jorge Navarro Sanchez (born 3 February 1996) is a Spanish motorcycle racer. He raced in the Moto2 and Moto3 classes during his Grand Prix motorcycle racing career. His best finishes were third in the 2016 Moto3 World Championship and fourth in the 2019 Moto2 World Championship. In 2023, he moved to the Supersport World Championship. He has previously competed in the FIM CEV Moto3 series finishing as runner-up to Fabio Quartararo in 2014 and the CEV 125GP Championship.

Career

Supersport World Championship
From 2023, Navarro joins Ten Kate Racing Yamaha for Supersport World Championship.

Career statistics

CEV Buckler Moto3 Championship

Races by year
(key) (Races in bold indicate pole position, races in italics indicate fastest lap)

Grand Prix motorcycle racing

By season

By class

Races by year
(key) (Races in bold indicate pole position; races in italics indicate fastest lap)

Supersport World Championship

Races by year
(key) (Races in bold indicate pole position, races in italics indicate fastest lap)

 Season still in progress.

References

External links

 Jorge Navarro Official Website Jorge Navarro (english, spanish, german).

1996 births
Living people
Spanish motorcycle racers
Moto3 World Championship riders
Sportspeople from Valencia
Moto2 World Championship riders
Supersport World Championship riders